Sir Ben Kingsley (born Krishna Pandit Bhanji; 31 December 1943) is an English actor. He has received various accolades throughout his career spanning five decades, including an Academy Award, a British Academy Film Award, a Grammy Award, and two Golden Globe Awards. Kingsley was appointed Knight Bachelor in 2002 for services to the British film industry. In 2010, he was awarded a star on the Hollywood Walk of Fame. In 2013, he received the Britannia Award for Worldwide Contribution to Filmed Entertainment.

Born to an English mother and an Indian Gujarati father with roots in Jamnagar, Kingsley began his career in theatre, joining the Royal Shakespeare Company in 1967 and spending the next 15 years appearing mainly on stage. His starring roles included productions of As You Like It (his West End debut for the company at the Aldwych Theatre in 1967), Much Ado About Nothing, Richard III, The Tempest, A Midsummer Night's Dream, Hamlet and The Merry Wives of Windsor. Also known for his television roles, he's received four Primetime Emmy Award nominations for his performances in Murderers Among Us: The Simon Wiesenthal Story (1989), Joseph (1995), Anne Frank: The Whole Story (2001), and Mrs. Harris (2006).

In film, Kingsley is known for his starring role as Mahatma Gandhi in Richard Attenborough's Gandhi (1982), for which he subsequently won the Academy Award for Best Actor and BAFTA Award for Best Actor in a Leading Role. He also appeared as Itzhak Stern in Steven Spielberg's Schindler's List (1993), receiving a nomination for the BAFTA Award for Best Actor in a Supporting Role. Subsequent roles have included Maurice (1987), Bugsy (1990), Twelfth Night (1996), Sexy Beast (2000), House of Sand and Fog (2003), Elegy (2008), Shutter Island (2010), and Hugo (2011).

Kingsley played the character of Trevor Slattery in the Marvel Cinematic Universe, appearing in Iron Man 3 (2013), Shang-Chi and the Legend of the Ten Rings (2021), and the upcoming Disney+ series Wonder Man. He also acted in the blockbusters Prince of Persia: The Sands of Time (2010), Ender's Game (2013). Kingsley lent his voice to the films The Boxtrolls (2014), and The Jungle Book (2016).

Early life
Kingsley was born Krishna Pandit Bhanji (Gujarati: કૃષ્ણા પંડિત ભાણજી) on 31 December 1943, in Snainton, North Riding of Yorkshire. His mother, Anna Lyna Mary (née Goodman), was an English actress and model. She was born out of wedlock and "was loath to speak of her background". His father, Rahimtulla Harji Bhanji, was born in the East Africa Protectorate (which later became, in 1920, the Colony and Protectorate of Kenya) to a family from the Indian city of Jamnagar, of Khoja Gujarati descent. Kingsley's paternal grandfather, Harji Bhanji, was a successful spice trader who had moved from India to the Sultanate of Zanzibar, where Kingsley's father lived until moving to the United Kingdom at the age of 14. Kingsley's maternal grandfather was believed by the family to have been of Russian- or German-Jewish descent, while his maternal grandmother was English and worked in the garment district of London's East End. Kingsley stated in 1994, "I'm not Jewish, and though there might be some Russian-Jewish heritage way back on my mother's side, the thread is so fine there's no real evidence." In a 2016 interview, he indicated that his maternal grandmother was impregnated by a Russian Jewish immigrant who later abandoned her, which led her to become a "vile anti-Semite."

Kingsley grew up in Pendlebury, Lancashire. Although his father was a Gujarati Khoja who practised Isma'ili Islam, Kingsley was not raised in his father's faith, and identifies as a Quaker. He was educated at the Manchester Grammar School, where one of his classmates was actor Robert Powell. Kingsley went on to study at De La Salle College in Salford, which later became home to The Ben Kingsley Theatre. While at college, he became involved in amateur dramatics in Manchester, making his professional stage debut on graduation, aged 23.

Career

1967–1981: Stage work and early career
After graduating, in 1966, Kingsley was approached by music producer and manager Dick James. James, who was the publisher of The Beatles, offered to mould Kingsley into a pop star. Kingsley declined James' offer, and instead chose to join the Royal Shakespeare Company (RSC) in 1967 after an audition before Trevor Nunn.

Devoting himself almost exclusively to stage work for the next 15 years, he made his West End debut for the company at the Aldwych Theatre in 1967 in a production of As You Like It. Further productions for the RSC included Much Ado About Nothing, Richard III, The Tempest, A Midsummer Night's Dream (starring in Peter Brook's acclaimed 1970 RSC production as Demetrius), Hamlet and The Merry Wives of Windsor.

In the 1960s, Kingsley anglicised his name to Ben Kingsley, fearing that a foreign name would hamper his career. He told the Radio Times, "As soon as I changed my name, I got the jobs. I had one audition as Krishna Bhanji and they said, 'Beautiful audition but we don't quite know how to place you in our forthcoming season.' I changed my name, crossed the road, and they said when can you start?" Kingsley went on to play Mosca in Peter Hall's 1977 production of Ben Jonson's Volpone for the Royal National Theatre. He also starred in the role of Willy Loman in a 1982 Sydney production of Death of a Salesman opposite Mel Gibson.

1982–1998: Transition to film and television

Kingsley began his transition to film roles early on, starting with Fear Is the Key in 1972. Kingsley continued to play small roles in both film and television, including a role as Ron Jenkins on the soap opera Coronation Street from 1966 to 1967 and regular appearances as a defence counsel in the long-running British legal programme Crown Court. In 1975, he starred as Dante Gabriel Rossetti in the historical drama The Love School and appeared in the TV miniseries Dickens of London the following year.

A turning point in Kingsley's career came with the biographical film Gandhi (1982), directed by Richard Attenborough, in which Kingsley played the titular role of Gandhi. The film was a critical and financial success, and Kingsley won the Academy Award for Best Actor, the BAFTA Award for Best Actor in a Leading Role, and the Golden Globe Award for Best Actor – Motion Picture Drama for his performance.

Throughout the 1980s, Kingsley appeared in a variety of films, including supporting roles in Turtle Diary (1985) and Maurice (1987). He played the main character of Basil Pascali in Pascali's Island (1988), and went on to portray Dr. John Watson alongside Michael Caine's Sherlock Holmes in Without a Clue that year. He was nominated for an Academy Award for Best Supporting Actor for his portrayal of the organized crime figure Meyer Lansky in Bugsy (1991). Additional roles include the supporting character of Cosmo in the thriller film Sneakers (1992), Vice President Gary Nance in Dave (1993), and the chess teacher Bruce Pandolfini in Searching for Bobby Fischer (1993).

In Steven Spielberg's historical drama film Schindler's List (1993), Kingsley portrayed the Holocaust survivor Itzhak Stern alongside Liam Neeson as Oskar Schindler. The film was a critical and commercial success, and Kingsley received a nomination for BAFTA Award for Best Actor in a Supporting Role. Further roles include the BBC adaptation of Silas Marner (1985) as the titular character. Kingsley starred alongside Sigourney Weaver in Death and the Maiden (1994), having previously acted with her in Dave.

In 1997, he provided a voice in the video game Ceremony of Innocence. In 1998, he was the head of the jury at the 48th Berlin International Film Festival and starred in the family film Spooky House, saying he had chosen a role in a lighter film after acting in roles that left him feeling traumatized.

1999–present: Further success

Kingsley took on the role of Don Logan, a violent psychopath and recruiter for London's underworld, in Jonathan Glazer's Sexy Beast (2000), a psychological black comedy crime film. Kingsley's role as Logan earned him another Academy Award nomination for Best Supporting Actor. A year later, he won a Crystal Globe award for having an outstanding artistic contribution to world cinema at the Karlovy Vary International Film Festival. He earned another Oscar nomination for Best Actor for his role as Colonel Massoud Amir Behrani in House of Sand and Fog (2003), and played a supporting role as Benjamin O'Ryan in Suspect Zero (2004). Although the film received negative reviews from critics, reservations were made for Kingsley's performance.

In July 2006, Kingsley received an Emmy nomination for his performance in the made-for-TV film Mrs. Harris, in which he played famed cardiologist Herman Tarnower, who was murdered by his jilted lover, Jean Harris. Later that year, he made a cameo appearance in an episode of The Sopranos titled "Luxury Lounge". Kingsley plays himself in the episode as Chris and Little Carmine pitch him the role of a mob boss in the film Cleaver, which he turns down. In 2007, Kingsley appeared as a Polish American mobster in the Mafia comedy You Kill Me, and a hitman in War, Inc.

The years 2010 and 2011 contained several big roles for Kingsley. In 2010, he worked voicing a character named Sabine in the Lionhead Studios game Fable III and starred alongside Leonardo DiCaprio in Shutter Island (2010), directed by Martin Scorsese. That same year, Kingsley made his Bollywood debut in the thriller Teen Patti (2010). In 2011, he appeared in Scorsese's next film, Hugo (2011), playing the French illusionist Georges Méliès. Kingsley's portrayal of Méliès also earned him a Saturn Award for Best Actor. Kingsley also signed on to the sci-fi romance feature Broken Dream. The feature, by Neil Jordan and John Boorman, was later scrapped.

In 2013, Kingsley appeared as the villain Trevor Slattery in the Marvel Cinematic Universe film Iron Man 3, and as the hero Mazer Rackham in Ender's Game. A year later he played the Hebrew slave Nun in Ridley Scott's Exodus: Gods and Kings and Merenkahre, a simulacrum of an Egyptian pharaoh and father of Ahkmenrah, in Shawn Levy's Night at the Museum: Secret of the Tomb That same year, Kingsley would also reprise his role as Slattery in the direct-to-video short film All Hail the King.

In 2015, Kingsley portrayed a Sikh driving instructor in the film Learning to Drive. He voiced Bagheera in the live-action adaptation of Jon Favreau's The Jungle Book (2016), a remake of the original 1967 film. Kingsley also recorded Yogananda's Autobiography of a Yogi in book-on-tape format. In 2018, he narrated Amazon Prime's documentary All or Nothing: Manchester City which followed Manchester City's record breaking 2017–18 Premier League campaign. and served as the voice of General Woundwort in the BBC adaptation of Watership Down. Kingsley reprised his role as Trevor Slattery in the film Shang-Chi and the Legend of the Ten Rings (2021).

Kingsley will appear in Wes Anderson's The Wonderful Story of Henry Sugar (2023), a film adaptation of a short story by Roald Dahl, and will star opposite Ralph Fiennes, Dev Patel and Benedict Cumberbatch.

Personal life

Kingsley has been married four times and has four children: Thomas Bhanji and artist Jasmin Bhanji, with first wife, actress Angela Morant, and Edmund Kingsley and Ferdinand Kingsley, both of whom became actors, with second wife, theatrical director Alison Sutcliffe. He divorced his third wife Alexandra Christmann in 2005, having been "deeply, deeply shocked" after pictures of her kissing another man surfaced on the internet. On 3 September 2007, Kingsley married Brazilian actress Daniela Lavender at Eynsham Hall in North Leigh, Oxfordshire.

Kingsley appeared in a production of The Children's Monologues in 2013 on stage in London alongside Benedict Cumberbatch, Tom Hiddleston, Gemma Arterton and Eddie Redmayne. It was performed on behalf of Dramatic Need, a charity that sends international arts professionals (such as musicians, artists, and actors) to host workshops in underprivileged and rural communities in Africa.

Recognition and honours

Kingsley won an Academy Award in the Best Actor category for Gandhi, and has been nominated three more times: Best Supporting Actor for Bugsy and Sexy Beast, and Best Actor for House of Sand and Fog (2003). In 1984, Kingsley won a Grammy Award for Best Spoken Word or Nonmusical Recording for The Words of Gandhi, received an honorary degree from the University of Salford, and was awarded the Indian civilian honour Padma Shri.

He was made a Knight Bachelor in the 2002 New Year Honours for services to the British film industry. The award was announced on 31 December 2001, which happened to be Kingsley's 58th birthday. After being knighted by Queen Elizabeth II at Buckingham Palace, Kingsley stated:

His demand to be called 'Sir' in film and TV show credits was documented by the BBC, to some criticism. Co-star Penélope Cruz was reportedly unsure what to call him during the filming of Elegy as someone had told her she needed to refer to him as "Sir Ben". One day it slipped out as such, and she called him that for the remainder of the shoot. Kingsley has denied accusations that he prefers to be referred to by his title, saying, "If I've ever insisted on being called 'Sir' by colleagues on a film set then I am profoundly sorry. I don't remember ever doing that and I tend not to forget."
In May 2010, Kingsley was awarded a star on the Hollywood Walk of Fame. In April 2013, Kingsley was honoured with the Fellowship Award at The Asian Awards in London.

Filmography

References

External links

 
 

1943 births
Living people
20th-century English male actors
21st-century English male actors
Actors awarded knighthoods
Actors from Scarborough, North Yorkshire
Annie Award winners
Audiobook narrators
BAFTA Most Promising Newcomer to Leading Film Roles winners
Best Actor Academy Award winners
Best Actor BAFTA Award winners
Best Drama Actor Golden Globe (film) winners
English male film actors
English male Shakespearean actors
English male stage actors
English male television actors
English male voice actors
English people of Gujarati descent
English people of Indian descent
English people of Kenyan descent
English people of Russian-Jewish descent
English Quakers
European Film Award for Best Actor winners
Grammy Award winners
Knights Bachelor
Male actors from Salford
Male actors from Yorkshire
National Youth Theatre members
New Star of the Year (Actor) Golden Globe winners
Outstanding Performance by a Male Actor in a Miniseries or Television Movie Screen Actors Guild Award winners
People educated at Manchester Grammar School
People from Pendlebury
People from Snainton
Recipients of the Padma Shri in arts
Royal Shakespeare Company members